The following is a list of Lakes in Uruguay.

Lakes 
Laguna de Castillos
Laguna Garzón
Laguna José Ignacio
Laguna Negra
Laguna de Rocha
Laguna del Sauce
Merín Lake
Rincón del Bonete Lake

See also 
 Water resources management in Uruguay

References 

Uruguay
Lakes